Kung Fu Panda World was a browser-based video game. The game was themed after the Kung Fu Panda franchise of DreamWorks Animation, where players could move their character around a pre-rendered 2D world and participate in a variety of mini-games. Two and a half years in the making, the game was closed down principally towards children. On July 15, 2012, the game was discontinued and removed, and the website now redirects to the main Kung Fu Panda website.

References

2010 video games
Browser games
Kung Fu Panda video games
Massively multiplayer online games
Video games developed in the United States